Cayley Glacier is a glacier flowing northwest into the south side of Brialmont Cove, on the west coast of Graham Land.

History
Cayley Glacier was photographed by the Falkland Islands and Dependencies Aerial Survey Expedition in 1956–57 and mapped from these photos by the Falkland Islands Dependencies Survey. It was named by the UK Antarctic Place-Names Committee in 1960 for Sir George Cayley, English engineer, the "father of aeronautica," who first defined the main principles of mechanical flight, 1796–1857, and also designed the first caterpillar tractor in 1826.

See also 
 List of glaciers in the Antarctic
 Glaciology

External links 

 Cayley Glacier on USGS website 
 Cayley Glacier on SCAR website
 Cayley Glacier Satellite image
 Cayley Glacier area map

References
 

Glaciers of Danco Coast